Dolichomastix is the scientific name of two genera of organisms and may refer to:

Dolichomastix (alga), a genus of green algae in the family Dolichomastigaceae
Dolichomastix (wasp), a genus of wasps in the family Ichneumonidae